The 2012 Cloverdale Cash Spiel is an annual curling bonspiel that was held from September 14 to 16 at the Cloverdale Curling Club in Surrey, British Columbia as part of the 2012–13 World Curling Tour. The purses for the men's and women's events were CAD$8,050 for both events, with the winning teams of Brent Pierce and Wang Bingyu taking home the prize.

Men

Teams

Round-robin standings

Playoffs

Women

Teams

Round-robin standings

Playoffs

External links

Cloverdale Cash Spiel
Cloverdale Cash Spiel
Sport in Surrey, British Columbia
Curling in British Columbia